Northern Forest may refer to:

 Northern Forest (England), a proposed preserve
 Northern Forest (race), a Russian car rally
 Great North Woods, an American forest spanning northern New England and New York
 Subarctic, an anthropological region referred to as "Northern Forest" in some textbooks
 Northern Forest Complex, a protected area in Myanmar; see Hkakaborazi National Park

See also